Harold Rosen may refer to:
Harold Rosen (educationalist) (1919–2008), American born, British socialist educationalist
Harold Rosen (electrical engineer) (1926–2017), American, known as "the father of the geostationary satellite"
Harold Rosen (businessman), Executive Director of the Grassroots Business Fund
Harold Rosen (politician) (1906–1989), member of the Massachusetts House of Representatives
Harold Rosen (mayor) (1925–2018), mayor of Miami Beach, Florida